Poe v. Ullman, 367 U.S. 497 (1961), was a United States Supreme Court case that held that plaintiffs lacked standing to challenge a Connecticut law that banned the use of contraceptives and banned doctors from advising their use because the law had never been enforced. Therefore, any challenge to the law was deemed unripe because there was no actual threat of injury to anyone who disobeyed the law. The same statute would later be challenged again (successfully) in Griswold v. Connecticut.

Harlan's dissent
Justice Harlan dissented and, reaching the merits, took a broad view of the "liberty" protected by the Fourteenth Amendment's Due Process Clause to include not merely state violations of one of the first eight amendments which had been held to be "incorporated" in the Fourteenth, but against any law which imposed on "liberty" unjustifiably. Harlan described the "liberty" protected by that clause as "a rational continuum which, broadly speaking, includes a freedom from all substantial arbitrary impositions and purposeless restraints."

Justice Harlan summarizes his view of the scope and content of substantive due process protection is this passage:

Justice Harlan also noted that laws regulating homosexuality, fornication, and adultery could be permitted under this analysis:

Douglas's dissent
Justice Douglas's general view that the Bill of Rights' guarantees, broadly construed, overlapped to produce social spheres and Associations insulated from government interference separate from the core political purposes of the Bill of Rights became the majority opinion in Griswold v. Connecticut. 

Douglass addressed the First Amendment rights of doctors. 

Douglass next addressed the rights of married couples, contending that that the Connecticut's Law barring the use of contraceptives would be impossible to enforce without violating the First, Third, Fourth, or Fifth Amendments. 

While Griswold v. Connecticut's conception of privacy was later characterized as establishing heightened scrutiny of bans upon contraception, Douglas rejected such an approach. 

Douglas also emphasized that he believed all of the Bill of Rights applied to the States, consistent with Justice Black's dissent in Adamson v. California.

Impact
Justice Harlan's general view has had enormous influence on the modern Supreme Court; Justice David Souter endorsed the general reasoning behind Justice Harlan's test in his concurrence in 1997's Washington v. Glucksberg. Souter wrote that Harlan's dissent used substantive due process, and recent cases demonstrated the "legitimacy of the modern justification" for that approach.

Justice Douglas's approach was adopted in Griswold v. Connecticut, and appeared in other cases such as Lombard v. Louisiana, Bell v. Maryland, and Doe v. Bolton. Privacy was likewise centered for Fourth Amendment purposes in Katz v. United States and Stanley v. Georgia. Following Douglas's retirement, the Supreme Court adopted a more restrained approach towards individual rights guarantees under the Burger Court and Rehnquist Court. 

Douglas's preferred approach to incorporation—treating the dissent in Adamson v. California as definitive on the issue of the Bill of Rights—would largely be overlooked by the Supreme Court until Justice Thomas's opinion in McDonald v. City of Chicago.

See also
 List of United States Supreme Court cases, volume 367

References

Further reading

External links
 

American Civil Liberties Union litigation
United States Constitution Article Three case law
United States reproductive rights case law
United States standing case law
United States Supreme Court cases
United States Supreme Court cases of the Warren Court
1961 in United States case law